Robine Schürmann (born 31 January 1989) is a Swiss athlete specialising in the 400 metres hurdles. She represented her country at three consecutive European Championships.

Her personal best in the event is 55.53 seconds set in Basel in 2018.

International competitions

References

1989 births
Living people
Swiss female hurdlers
Competitors at the 2015 Summer Universiade